, provisional designation  is a sub-kilometer asteroid on an eccentric orbit, classified as a near-Earth object and potentially hazardous asteroid of the Apollo group. It was discovered on 20 June 1999, by the Lowell Observatory Near-Earth-Object Search (LONEOS) at its U.S. Anderson Mesa Station in Flagstaff, Arizona. The first observation was made by Catalina Sky Survey just 8 days before its official discovery.

Orbit and classification 

The asteroid orbits the Sun at a distance of 0.6–2.6 AU once every 2 years and 1 month (756 days). Its orbit has an eccentricity of 0.61 and an inclination of 5° with respect to the ecliptic.

's orbit is very similar to that of 69230 Hermes, which in 1937 made what was for decades the closest observed approach to Earth by an asteroid. Its nearest pass to Earth within at least a century of present was the 930,000 kilometers one in 1875. In 2090 it passes Venus at 788,000 kilometers.

Physical characteristics 

Based on its absolute magnitude of 19.3, its mean-diameter is between 370 and 830 meters, assuming an albedo in the range of 0.05 to 0.25.

Numbering and naming 

This minor planet was numbered by the Minor Planet Center on 19 October 2005. As of 2018, it has not been named.

References

External links 
 MPEC from 1999 discovery
 MPEC from 2001
 Discovery Circumstances: Numbered Minor Planets (100001)-(105000) – Minor Planet Center
 List of the Potentially Hazardous Asteroids (PHAs), Minor Planet Center
 Asteroid Lightcurve Database (LCDB), query form (info )
 Asteroids and comets rotation curves, CdR – Observatoire de Genève, Raoul Behrend
 
 
 

101869
101869
101869
19990620